John Cawood may refer to:
John Cawood (printer) (1514–1572), English printer
John C. Cawood, Australian politician, served as first Government Resident of Central Australia 1926–1929